Samson Buck (born February 24, 1966) is an American politician who served in the Oklahoma House of Representatives from the 49th district from 2008 to 2010.

References

1966 births
Living people
Democratic Party members of the Oklahoma House of Representatives